Jovin (also Romanized as Jovīn, Javīn, Jawīn, and Joveyn) is a village in Lasgerd Rural District, in the Central District of Sorkheh County, Semnan Province, Iran. At the 2006 census, its population was 26, in 11 families.

References 

Populated places in Sorkheh County